Ambal Brahmapureeswarar Temple(அம்பல் பிரமபுரீசுவரர் கோயில்) is a Hindu temple located at Ambal in Tiruvarur district, Tamil Nadu, India. Now the place is known as Koilpatthu. The presiding deity is Shiva. He is called as Brahmapureeswarar. His consort is known as Poonkuzhalammai. The historical name of the place is Punnakavanam. Shiva is worshipped as Brahmapureeswarar and his consort Parvathi as Poonguzhalammai. Ampal Brahmapureeswarar is revered in the 7th century Tamil Saiva canonical work, the Tevaram, written by Tamil saint poets known as the Nayanmars and classified as Paadal Petra Sthalam, the 275 temples revered in the canon. The temple is believed to be the last among the sixty maadakoil built by Kochengat Chola.

The temple has a three-tiered rajagopuram, the entrance tower and all the shrines are enclosed in rectangular walls. The temple has four daily rituals at various times from 6:00 a.m. to 8 p.m., and three yearly festivals on its calendar, namely Margazhi Tiruvathirai during the Tamil month of Margazhi (December - January), Kodabisheakam during Chittirai (April - May) and Aipassi Annabishekam during Aippassi (October - November) being the most prominent. The temple is maintained and administered by the Hindu Religious and Endowment Board of the Government of Tamil Nadu.

Legend
As per Hindu legend, Brahma, one of the trinities in Hindu mythology, worshipped Shiva in the temple to regain his original form. He was earlier cursed by Shiva to be a swan. Brahma is believed to been propitiated from his curse, after have taken a holy dip in Annam Poigai, the temple tank, before worshipping Shiva. As per another legend, Vinayaga in the temple is known as Patikkacupu Pillayar as he is believed to have offered a padi (a measuring tool) to the ruling king of the region named Nantan during a famine. The deity is also believed to have been worshiped by Manmatha, the cupid.

Significance 
It is one of the shrines of the 275 Paadal Petra Sthalams - Shiva Sthalams glorified in the early medieval Tevaram poems by Tamil Saivite Nayanar Tirugnanasambandar.

Literary mention 

Tirugnanasambandar describes the feature of the deity as:

References

External links 
 
 

Shiva temples in Tiruvarur district
Padal Petra Stalam
Maadakkoil